Lo Yan Shan is a mountain on Lantau Island, Hong Kong, with a height of  above sea level.

Geology 

Lo Yan Shan is formed by Granitic rocks, unlike many of the tallest mountains on Lantau Island, such as Lantau Peak, which are formed by Volcanic rocks.

Geography 

Lo Yan Shan is the tallest mountain on Chi Ma Wan peninsula. The Lantau Trail passes through the summit.

See also 

 List of mountains, peaks and hills in Hong Kong
 Mui Wo

References